Miss Patti's Christmas is a studio album by American singer Patti LaBelle. Her second holiday album, it was released by Def Soul Classics on October 9, 2007 in the United States. Chiefly produced by Jimmy Jam & Terry Lewis, it marked LaBelle's first Def Jam recording since abruptly leaving the label in 2006 over a dispute with then-president Antonio "L.A." Reid. Miss Patti's Christmas peaked at number 22 on the US Top Holiday Albums.

Critical reception

Andy Kellman from Allmusic found that "it's not a given that the disc will become part of each listener's annual holiday listening tradition, but it's all pleasant and enjoyable, and there are several moments where it is obvious that LaBelle is giving everything she has, rather than coasting through [...] Jam, Lewis, and LaBelle should seriously consider repurposing the very upbeat "Nativity" – one of four originals – into a song with an everyday lyrical theme. It's too well-made to be suitable only for once-a-year rotation."

Track listing

Notes
  denotes vocals producer

Charts

References

2007 Christmas albums
Patti LaBelle albums
Albums produced by Jimmy Jam and Terry Lewis
Christmas albums by American artists
Pop Christmas albums
Contemporary R&B Christmas albums